Lawrence Alan Yellen (born January 4, 1943) is an American former professional baseball pitcher. He was born in Brooklyn, New York, and is Jewish. He pitched in 14 games in Major League Baseball for the Houston Colt .45s in 1963 and 1964.

Notes

External links

1943 births
Living people
Amarillo Sonics players
Baseball players from New York (state)
Houston Colt .45s players
Hunter Hawks baseball players
Jewish American baseball players
Jewish Major League Baseball players
Lafayette High School (New York City) alumni
Major League Baseball pitchers
Oklahoma City 89ers players
San Antonio Bullets players
Sportspeople from Brooklyn
Baseball players from New York City
21st-century American Jews